Joseph Fogerty, CE, FRIBA, was an Irish civil engineer, architect, and novelist active in mid-to-late-nineteenth-century Limerick, London, and Vienna.

Born in Limerick, he studied under his father, engineer John Fogerty in Limerick before entering the University College, London in 1856, later working in London for Sir John Fowler.  He was elected Fellow of the Royal Institute of British Architects on 9 February 1880 after being proposed by Henry Currey, Edwin Nash and Charles Barry.  Three of his novels, Lauterdale, Caterina and Countess Irene, were published. He died at his house, Enderby, in Sydenham.

He was the brother and uncle of architects William Fogerty and John Frederick Fogerty, respectively. He married Hannah Cochrane (d. 1910), of Limerick and they had a daughter, Elsie Fogerty (born in Sydenham on 16 December 1865), who became a notable teacher of speech.

References

External links
 

1831 births
1899 deaths
Irish railway mechanical engineers
Engineers from County Limerick
Architects from Limerick (city)
Alumni of University College London
Fellows of the Royal Institute of British Architects
Irish male novelists
19th-century British novelists
19th-century Irish architects
19th-century British male writers
19th-century Irish novelists
19th-century Irish engineers
Writers from Limerick (city)